Torre Annunziata is a city and commune in the Metropolitan City of Naples, region of Campania in Italy. It is located on the Gulf of Naples at the foot of Mount Vesuvius.

History

The city was destroyed in the Vesuvius eruption of 79 AD and in 1631. It is known locally in the Neapolitan dialect as Torre Nunziata. The city was once the seat of important ironwork (Deriver, Dalmine) food processing and pasta industries. Today industries still active include naval, armament and pharmaceutical ones.

The archaeological site of Oplonti is a UNESCO World Heritage Site since 1997.

Geography
Torre Annunziata borders with the municipalities of Boscoreale, Boscotrecase, Castellammare di Stabia, Pompei, Torre del Greco and Trecase. Trains from Torre Annunziata Centrale rail station operate to Naples and Pompei.

Main sights
On the Tabula Peutingeriana, Torre Annunziata is called Oplonti.

In the communal territory, one of the richest Roman villas has been excavated. Dating to the 1st century BC, it probably belonged to the gens Poppaea, and is known as Villa Poppaea.

Dialect
Although a comparatively small town, essentially a suburb of Naples, Torre Annunziata has its own unique dialect, a variation of Neapolitan, quite distinct, particularly in pronunciation, which is known as Torrese.

Sport
Torre Annunziata is home to F.C. Savoia 1908 who play at the Stadio Giraud and currently play in Serie D of Italy's football pyramid. Their highest achievement was during the 1923–24 season where they finished Serie A runners up.

Professional footballer Ciro Immobile was born in Torre Annunziata.

Notable people
Dino De Laurentiis, film producer
Alberto Nocerino, footballer
Alfredo Donnarumma, footballer
Ciro Immobile, footballer
Irma Testa, boxer

References

Sources

External links

Official website

 
Coastal towns in Campania
Cities and towns in Campania
Destroyed cities
Former populated places in Italy
Pre-Roman cities in Italy
Archaeological sites in Italy
Populated coastal places in Italy
Roman sites of Campania
Populated places established in the 1st millennium BC
Tourist attractions in Italy
World Heritage Sites in Italy